The Castillonais or Cheval Ariègeois de Castillon , also formerly called Cheval du Biros or Saint-Gironnais, is an ancient breed of small rustic saddle-horse from the Ariège département of south-western France. It may be dark bay or seal brown. It stands  at the withers, with an average height of about  It is used principally for trekking and for driving.

The Castillonnais probably descends from the horses that inspired the Magdalenian-era paintings found, for example, at the Cave of Niaux, with Oriental and Iberian blood added later. Originally bred as a multi-purpose breed used for cavalry, agriculture and driving, the breed declined in population during the 20th century, and almost became extinct. In 1980, a group of supporters began to work to save the breed, and a breed association, now called the Association Nationale du Cheval Castillonnais d'Ariège Pyrénées, was formed in 1992. The breed was officially recognised by the French Ministry of Agriculture in 1996. The French government, breed association and a regional conservation group all now share an interest in the preservation of the breed. Population numbers are still quite low, and inbreeding is a concern.

History 

Like many other French breeds from the Pyrenees, the Castillonnais probably descends from the horses that inspired the Magdalenian-era paintings found, for example, at the Cave of Niaux. Over time, blood from Oriental and Iberian horses was added to the breed, and influenced its physical appearance and temperament. The Castillonnais was originally known as the "cheval du Biros" (Biros horse) or "Saint-Gironnais", a name from the town of Saint-Girons in Ariege in the Pyrenees, where a large horse fair was held the day after All Saints' Day. In the late nineteenth century, horses of the Pyrenees were known for their use as mounts by light cavalry. In 1908, Gabriel Lamarque, equine historian and president of the Société d’agriculture de l’Ariège (Agricultural Society of Ariege), began to study the breed as part of his work in the development of native horse populations in France.

The breed was originally a multi-purpose horse, used for agriculture, cavalry and pulling diligences (a type of carriage). Because of a lack of support from a breeding syndicate, such as the one in existence for the Mérens horse, once the need for a multi-purpose breed declined, the population of the Castillonnais dwindled. Many horses were crossbred with draught horses, and the breed almost became extinct. The intervention of a group of supporters in 1980 saved the breed from extinction, and in 1992 L'Association Pyrénéenne Ariégeoise du Cheval Castillonnais (the Ariege Pyrenees Association of Castillonnais Horses) was formed, with support from several French government agencies and stud farms. Annually, in August, the association holds a small competition and sale for the breed in Castillon-en-Couserans, which also includes inspections to register horses for the breed stud-book.

In 1996, the Castillonnais was officially recognised by the French Ministry of Agriculture, due to the efforts of a small number of breed enthusiasts, though by that time only 50 purebred mares remained. The breed association's name was changed to L’association Nationale du Cheval Castillonnais d'Ariège Pyrénées (ANCCAP) (National Association of Castillonnais Horses of the Ariège Pyrenees), and is headquartered in Castillon-en-Couserans. Le Conservatoire du Patrimoine Biologique Régional de Midi-Pyrénées (Conservatory of the Biological Heritage of the Midi-Pyrénées Region), an organisation that has worked to protect the diversity of animal species in the region since 1980, is also committed to protecting the breed.

Population numbers for the Castillonnais are quite low. The majority of breeders are located in Castillon-en-Couserans, in Ariège, but a few can be found in Brittany and Provence. In November 2005, there were only around 260 existing Castillonnais, and a goal was created by the breed association to double the number of purebred mares between 2005 and 2014. Inbreeding is a concern due to low population numbers, and the national stud farm at Tarbes and Institut National de la Recherche Agronomique (National Institute of Agronomic Research) have been brought in to help safeguard the genetic resources of the breed.

Characteristics
The physical characteristics seen in the breed are currently in flux, so there is not a single breed phenotype, though many members of the breed closely resemble the Mérens. Enthusiasts are breeding for a rustic mountain horse, of medium size, with good gaits and good temperament. Some members of the breed closely resemble Iberian horses such as the Andalusian horse. The official breed standard calls for a moderately long neck and long, sloped shoulder, broad back, rounded croup and muscular legs. Some members of the breed are branded on the left hindquarter. Because of its relative rarity and physical similarities, the Castillonnais is commonly confused with the Mérens.

Two colours are allowed in the breed: dark bay and seal brown. All horses are genetically tested  for colour before registration; no horse of any other colour can be registered. The breed is considered to be an easy keeper, with an easy-going temperament. The horses are agile, sure-footed on mountain paths, and exhibit extended gaits, with strong engagement of the hindquarters.

Uses 

The Castillonnais is used mainly for pleasure riding, and it is well adapted to the mountainous terrain of the Pyrenees, which makes is useful for equestrian tourism in the area. It can be used for driving, and is sometimes seen in dressage competitions. Some are used for logging and as pack horses for taking food and equipment to mountainous areas otherwise only accessible by helicopter.

References 

Horse breeds originating in France